Lochar may refer to:

 Lochar (ward), Dumfries and Galloway, Scotland
 Lochar Moss Torc, an Iron Age brass torc
 Lochar Thistle F.C., Dumfries, Scotland
 Lochar Water, a stream in Dumfries and Galloway

See also
 Locher (disambiguation)